The Journal of LGBT Youth is a quarterly peer-reviewed academic journal covering gender studies especially as pertaining to LGBT youth. It was established in 2003 as Journal of Gay & Lesbian Issues in Education, obtaining its current title in 2008, and is published by Routledge. The editors-in-chief are James T. Sears and Kristopher Wells (MacEwan University).

Abstracting and indexing 
The journal is abstracted and indexed in:

References

External links

English-language journals
Routledge academic journals
LGBT-related journals
Publications established in 2003
Quarterly journals